Falls Mills is an  unincorporated community along Virginia State Route 102 in Tazewell County, Virginia, United States and is located at the mouth of Mud Fork Valley. It is part of the Bluefield, WV-VA micropolitan area, which has a population of 107,578.

History
Falls Mills received its name from a mill there, located at a natural dam in the Bluestone River. Another dam, built by Norfolk and Western Railroad across Mud Fork creek reaches twenty feet high and spans several hundred feet to form a lake more than a mile long. Through the mid- to late 1900s the lake was a summer resort area with boating, fishing and cabins. Residents still enjoy fishing in the lake, which is maintained and stocked by the Falls Mills Fishing Club.

Perhaps the most notable event to occur there is known as the Engagement at Falls Mills. On July 20, 1863 at dawn, the Confederate cavalry of Major Andrew J. May surprised a Union raiding party led by Lt. Col Freeman E. Franklin. The Union cavalry was chased from its bivouac in nearby Brown's Meadow, where it was preparing to burn the Falls Mill, and fled north toward Abbs Valley. Brigadier General John Stuart Williams' Confederate cavalry struck the Union raiders as they withdrew up the valley, causing them to abandon captured livestock and contraband slaves.

References

Unincorporated communities in Virginia
Unincorporated communities in Tazewell County, Virginia